Qamar Zaman (born 11 April 1952 in Quetta, Balochistan, Pakistan) is a former squash player from Pakistan. He was one of the leading players in the game of Squash during the 1970s and 1980s. His biggest triumph was winning the British Open Squash Championships in 1975. He lives in Peshawar.

Qamar won the Pakistan junior squash championship in 1968. On his first trip to the United Kingdom in 1973, he reached the semi-finals of the British Amateur championship. In 1974, he reached the semi-finals of the British Open and won the Australian Amateur championship.

In the 1975 British Open, Qamar stunned and beat the defending-champion Geoff Hunt of Australia in the quarter-finals, and went on to win the title beating his fellow Pakistani player Gogi Alauddin in the final 9-7, 9-6, 9-1.

Subsequently, Qamar reached the British Open final on four further occasions. He was runner-up to Hunt in 1978, 1979 and 1980, and to Jahangir Khan in 1984. He was also runner-up at the World Open four times, losing to Hunt in the finals of 1976, 1979 and 1980, and to Jahangir in 1984.

Awards and recognition
Pride of Performance Award by the President of Pakistan in 1984

References

External links 
 
 https://psaworldtour.com/news/view/5733/g-o-a-t-13-qamar-zaman-janet-morgan

1952 births
Living people
Pashtun people
People from Quetta
Pakistani male squash players
Recipients of the Pride of Performance